Versoporcus was an extinct genus of even-toed ungulates that existed during the Miocene in Europe. Two species are recognized, V. grivensis and V. steinheimensis.

References

Prehistoric Suidae
Miocene mammals of Europe
Miocene even-toed ungulates
Prehistoric even-toed ungulate genera